The Uttar Pradesh football team (also known as Uttar Pradesh Football Sangh) is an Indian football team representing Uttar Pradesh in Indian state football competitions including the Santosh Trophy.

Honours
 B.C. Roy Trophy
 Runners-up (1): 2017–18
 Mir Iqbal Hussain Trophy
 Winners (1): 2008–09
 Runners-up (2): 1978–79, 1980

References

Santosh Trophy teams
Football in Uttar Pradesh